Autoroute 20 is a Quebec Autoroute, following the Saint Lawrence River through one of the more densely populated parts of Canada, with its central section forming the main route of the Trans-Canada Highway from the A-25 interchange to the A-85 interchange. At , it is the longest Autoroute in Quebec. It is one of two main links between Montreal and Quebec City; the other is the A-40.

There are two sections of the A-20, separated by a  gap. The second, more northerly section is far shorter. Constructed as a super two autoroute (one lane in each direction), this section of the A-20 bypasses Rimouski to the south and ends at a roundabout junction with Highway 132 in Mont-Joli. While the Quebec government has completed environmental and economic reviews of the impact of linking the two sections of Autoroute 20, it has not committed the funds necessary for construction. Citing the high number of accidents on the Rimouski-Mont-Joli link of the A-20, many politicians in the Bas-Saint-Laurent region have criticized the government's lack of progress in linking the two sections of autoroute and twinning the two-lane portion.

Description

Autoroute du Souvenir

Montérégie
A-20 begins at the Ontario-Quebec border near Rivière-Beaudette as the continuation of Ontario Highway 401. The westernmost section of A-20 was named the Autoroute du Souvenir (Remembrance Highway) in 2007 to honour Canadian veterans. Road marker signs on this stretch of the autoroute feature a poppy (a traditional symbol of Remembrance in Canada).

At km 29, A-20 crosses A-30 (former A-540) before becoming an urban boulevard for approximately eight kilometres (km 30 to 38) in Vaudreuil-Dorion and L'Île-Perrot. This stretch of highway takes A-20 across the Ottawa River. The speed limit is 50 km/h (30 mph) in Vaudreuil-Dorion and 70 km/h (45 mph) in L'Île-Perrot. A-20 once again becomes a limited-access highway at km 38, just before crossing the Sainte-Anne-de-Bellevue Canal onto the Island of Montreal.

Montreal region
A-20 then traverses the West Island (in French, l'Ouest de l'Île) along the north shore of Lac Saint-Louis to an interchange with A-520. Commonly called the Dorval Interchange, this exit is the main access to Montreal's Trudeau International Airport. Further east, A-20 crosses the A-13 at its southern terminus, and then, at the St. Pierre Interchange, Route 138 west towards the Mercier Bridge.

Just west of downtown Montreal, A-20, A-15, and Route 136 meet at the Turcot Interchange. In 2020, the completion of a major project involving the rebuilding of the Turcot Interchange has shifted the autoroute north between Route 138 and the interchange. From there, A-20 east is multiplexed with A-15 south on the approach to the Samuel-de-Champlain Bridge.

Longueuil
Multiplexed with A-10 and A-15, all three autoroutes cross the Saint Lawrence River via the Samuel-de-Champlain Bridge to Longueuil. The multiplex splits south of the bridge. The A-20 parallels the south shore of the river through suburban Longueuil. The junction with A-25 affords a direct connection to the Louis Hippolyte Lafontaine Bridge-Tunnel and Montreal's East End. The Trans-Canada Highway joins A-20 at this junction.

Autoroute Jean-Lesage

The longest section of A-20 (from its junction with A-25 to its easternmost terminus) is named after Jean Lesage, who served as Premier of Quebec from 1960 to 1966, during the Quiet Revolution. Autoroute Jean-Lesage currently exists as two discontinuous sections separated by about 55 kilometres:
 The main section between the Louis-Hippolyte-Lafontaine Bridge-Tunnel and Trois-Pistoles in the Bas-Saint-Laurent region.
 A shorter section that serves as a bypass of Rimouski and extends east to a final terminus at Route 132 in Mont-Joli.

Main section

Centre-du-Québec
From the junction with A-25, A-20 travels east, away from the St. Lawrence River. At kilometre 98, A-20 intersects A-30 near Boucherville, crossing the Richelieu River (km 112) just north of Mont-Saint-Hilaire. Bypassing Saint-Hyacinthe, A-20 forms a multiplex with Route 116 for six kilometres between exits 141 and 147. This section of A-20 in Centre-du-Québec is located the furthest from the St. Lawrence River (approximately 45 kilometres). Between Drummondville and Sainte-Eulalie, A-20 forms a multiplex with A-55 for 37 kilometres.

Quebec City region
A-20 continues across the Great Lakes–St. Lawrence Lowlands and Quebec's agricultural heartland. The autoroute once again parallels the river as it approaches metropolitan Quebec City. From this point eastward, A-20 is never more than five kilometres from the river. At km 312, A-20 crosses the A-73, a north–south link between Saint-Georges and Quebec City via the Pierre Laporte Bridge. While the control city on A-20 is listed as "Québec", the autoroute never enters the city proper. Before departing the region, the freeway bypasses suburban Lévis.

Chaudière-Appalaches and Bas-Saint-Laurent

As it continues eastward, A-20 passes the regional centres of Montmagny and La Pocatière before approaching Rivière-du-Loup and the junction with A-85 at km 499. The Trans-Canada Highway departs A-20 at this interchange and travels southeast on A-85 toward Edmundston, New Brunswick and the Maritime Provinces. At km 518, the highway becomes a super two for the remainder of its main section. The eastern end of the main section of the A-20 is located in Trois-Pistoles, approximately 40 kilometres east of Rivière-du-Loup.

Rimouski section

The second section of Autoroute Jean-Lesage (km 597 to km 641) connects Rimouski to Mont-Joli. It begins at a junction with Route 132 in Rimouski, approximately 55 km from the current terminus of A-20's main section. Like its larger counterpart, the Rimouski section of A-20 parallels the St. Lawrence, providing a southern bypass of Rimouski before ending (at another junction with Route 132) at the western approach to Mont-Joli.

This section of the A-20 is currently a single carriageway with occasional passing lanes. It was built to accommodate an eventual expansion to four lanes and most overpasses include the clearance needed to accommodate the additional lanes. The high accident rate along this section of A-20 have prompted many politicians to call for the highway to be expanded to two lanes in each direction.

An electric fence has been installed on both sides of the highway between km 621 and 628 to prevent moose from crossing the road, while at km 624 an underpass has been constructed to allow wildlife to pass under the highway safely.

Future
Transports Québec (MTQ) is currently engaged in several projects designed to connect the two segments of A-20.

Long-range plans by the MTQ call for the two sections of A-20 to meet. A 9.8 km section of single carriageway was opened to traffic on December 3, 2011 between Cacouna and L'Isle-Verte. As part of this project, a few kilometres of the highway near Cacouna was moved 1.5 km to the south and the old roadbed was destroyed. The MTQ timeline for completing the highway to Trois-Pistoles was met; it opened to traffic in November 2015. Overpasses were constructed for the St-Paul, St-Éloi and Drapeau roads.

Regarding the section from Trois-Pistoles to Rimouski, the Quebec government has completed environmental and economic reviews of the impact of linking the two sections of Autoroute 20, but it has not committed the funds necessary for construction. Frustrated by the long delay in linking the two sections of A-20, in 2013, the Mayor of Rimouski proposed paying for the construction by tolling the autoroute.

Citing predictions for an increase in ferry traffic to and from the Côte-Nord as a result of the Government of Quebec's Plan Nord, in 2011 the Mayor of Matane called for the further extension of A-20 to his city.

Popular culture
Autoroute 20 serves as the backdrop to the popular 2002 Quebec film Québec-Montréal by Ricardo Trogi about seven twenty-something travellers driving between the two cities.

The Quebec French expression "à l'autre bout de la 20" (in English, at the other end of the 20) refers to Montreal when the speaker is in Quebec City, and to Quebec City when one is in Montreal.

Other names
Older Anglophone Montrealers sometimes still refer to the section of the A-20 west of the city as Highway 2-20 (or "The Two and Twenty"), but the Route 2 designation was dropped in the mid 1970s.

Exit list

Rest stops

There are 15 rest stops located at the following points along Autoroute 20, and contain the following services:

Gallery
A-20 eastbound

A-20 westbound

See also
 List of bridges in Montreal
 List of crossings of the Ottawa River
 List of crossings of the Saint Lawrence River

Notes

References

External links

 A-20 at motorways-exits.com 
 A-20 at Quebec Autoroutes
 Transports Quebec Map  
 Veteran from Gaspé behind idea to rename Quebec highway to remember war dead
 Autoroute 20 @ Asphaltplanet.ca

20
Quebec 020
1964 establishments in Quebec